Bermani Ilir is a district (kecamatan) of Kepahiang Regency, Bengkulu, Indonesia.

Subdistricts 
 Keban Agung
 Air Raman 
 Batu Belarik 
 Bukit Menyan 
 Cinta Mandi 
 Cinta Mandi Baru 
 Embong Ijuk 
 Embong Sido 
 Gunung Agung 
 Kembang Seri 
 Kota Agung 
 Langgar Jaya 
 Limbur Lama 
 Muara Langkap 
 Pagar Agung 
 Sosokan Cinta Mandi 
 Taba Baru 
 Talang Pito 
 Talang Sawah

Districts of Kepahiang Regency